The following is a list of notable individuals who converted to Catholicism from Islam (including to Eastern Catholic Churches).

Converts

A

 Jean Mohamed Ben Abdeljlil, Moroccan Roman Catholic priest and a Catholic convert from Islam.
 Basuki Abdullah (1915–1993), Indonesian painter
 Leo Africanus (c. 1494–c. 1554?), Berber Andalusi Moorish diplomat and author who was converted to Christianity following his capture
 Bernard of Alzira (1135–1181), Andalusian prince and diplomat
 Juan Andrés, Spanish Islamic scholar who converted to Catholicism and wrote a well known polemical work against Islam, the Confusión o confutación de la secta mahomética y del Alcorán
 Juliana Awada (born 1974), Lebanese-Argentine businesswoman and First Lady of Argentina

B

 Josephine Bakhita (ca. 1869–1947), Sudanese-Italian Canossian religious sister and Roman Catholic saint from Darfur, Sudan. She was forcibly converted to Islam. On 9 January 1890 Bakhita was baptised with the names of Josephine Margaret and Fortunata.
Bayano, also known as Ballano or Vaino, was an African enslaved by Spaniards who led the biggest slave revolts of 16th century in Panama
Mohammed Christophe Bilek, Algerian former Muslim who lives in France since 1961; baptized Roman Catholic in 1970; in the 1990s, he founded Our Lady of Kabyle, a French website devoted to evangelisation among Muslims
Francis Bok – Sudanese-American activist, convert to Islam from Christianity; but later returned to his Christian faith
 Jean-Bédel Bokassa (1921–1996), dictator of the Central African Republic and its successor state, the Central African Empire in what he became and declared Emperor (Bokassa was born Catholic Christian, converted himself to Sunni Islam for a year and a half, and came back to Catholic Christianity).

C

 Moussa Dadis Camara – ex-officer of the Guinean army who served as the President of the Republic of Guinea; Roman Catholic Christian convert from Islam
 Rianti Cartwright – Indonesian actress, model, presenter and VJ; two weeks before departure to the United States to get married, she left the Muslim faith to become a baptized Catholic with the name Sophia Rianti Rhiannon Cartwright
 Chehab family – prominent Lebanese noble family; having converted from Sunni Islam, the religion of his predecessors, was the first Maronite ruler of the Emirate of Mount Lebanon
 Djibril Cissé – French international footballer
Hansen Clarke – U.S. Representative for Michigan's 13th congressional district
 Constantine the African – Baghdad-educated Muslim who died in 1087 as a Christian monk at Monte Cassino
 Casilda of Toledo (1007-1107), Muslim princess, the daughter of the ruler of Toledo.

D
 Justinus Darmojuwono (1914–1994), first Indonesian Cardinal of the Catholic Church; converted to Catholicism in 1932, served as Archbishop of Semarang from 1963 to 1981, and was elevated to the cardinalate in 1967
 Bob Denard, French soldier and mercenary. Born a Roman Catholic, Denard converted first to Judaism, then to Islam, and finally back to Catholicism again

E
 Estevanico (c. 1500–1539), Berber originally from Morocco and one of the early explorers of the Southwestern United States

F

 Joseph Fadelle (born Mohammed al-Sayyid al-Moussawi in 1964), Roman Catholic convert from Islam and writer born in 1964 in Iraq to a Shiite family
 Rima Fakih (born 1985), Lebanese-American model, actress, professional wrestler and beauty pageant titleholder, Miss USA 2010, converted to the Maronite Church from Shia Islam upon marriage to her Maronite husband

G
 George XI of Kartli, Georgian monarch who ruled Eastern Georgia from 1676 to 1688 and again from 1703 to 1709; an Eastern Orthodox Christian, he converted to Islam prior to his appointment as governor of Qandahar; later converted to Roman Catholicism
 San Geronimo, a young Arab who had embraced Catholic Christianity, and had been baptized with the name of Geronimo

H
 Maria Hertogh, Dutch woman child who had been raised by Muslims, more later returned to her Catholic biological parents

I
 Antuan Ilgit (born in 1972), Turkish-Italian Jesuit

J

 Sabatina James (born 1982), born in Dhedar, Pakistani-Austrian book author; started a new life in Vienna, changing her name and converting to Catholicism; baptized in 2006
 Lina Joy, Malay convert from Islam to Christianity; born Azlina Jailani in 1964 in Malaysia to Muslim parents of Javanese descent; converted at age 26; in 1998, she was baptized, and applied to have her conversion legally recognized by the Malaysian courts
 Don Juan of Persia (1560–1604), late 16th- and early 17th-century figure in Iran and Spain; also known as Faisal Nazary; was a native of Iran, who later moved westward; settled in Spain where he became a Roman Catholic

K
 George XI of Kartli (1651–1709), King of Kartli
 Ilyas Khan – British philanthropist and businessman. Notable British Roman Catholic convert from Islam
 Ivan Krušala – writer, diplomat, explorer and a Catholic convert from Islam.

L
 Lakandula – Filipino ruler before Spanish conquest of Philippines
 Balthazar of Loyola – Moroccan prince
 Fernão Lopes (soldier) (died 1545), 16th-century Portuguese soldier in India who converted to Roman Catholicism

M
 Enrique de Malaca – Malay slave of Ferdinand Magellan, converted to Roman Catholicism after being purchased in 1511
 Hubert Maga – former president of President of Dahomey
 Fadhma Aït Mansour – mother of French writers Jean Amrouche and Taos Amrouche
 Carlos Menem (born 1930), former Syrian-Argentinian President of Argentina; raised a Nusayri but converted to Roman Catholicism, a constitutional requirement for accessing the presidency until 1994
 Mizse – last Palatine of King Ladislaus IV of Hungary in 1290; born into a Muslim family in Tolna County in the Kingdom of Hungary; converted to Roman Catholicism
 Rajah Matanda – ruler of Maynila, a pre-Hispanic Tagalog polity along the Pasig River in what is now Manila, Philippines
 Archbishop Thomas Luke Msusa – born into a Muslim family; converted to Christianity as a child and later became an archbishop in his home country of Malawi, as well as converting and baptizing his father, a former imam
 Paul Mulla – Turkish scholar and professor of Islamic Studies at the Pontifical Oriental Institute

N
 Anthony Neyrot – Italian Dominican priest, apostate, reconvert, and martyr.

O

 Fata Omanović – Bosniak historical figure from Mostar, Bosnia and Herzegovina
 Karim Ouchikh – French lawyer and politician of Algerian (Kabylie) origin
 Malika Oufkir (born 1953), Berber-Moroccan writer and daughter of General Mohamed Oufkir; she and her siblings are converts from Islam to Catholicism; and she writes in her book, Stolen Lives, "we had rejected Islam, which had brought us nothing good, and opted for Catholicism instead"

P
 Shams Pahlavi (1917–1996), Princess of Iran and the elder sister of Mohammad Reza Pahlavi, Shah of Iran
 Sigi Wimala - Indonesian model and actress, converted to Catholicism after marriage with famous director, Timo Tjahtanto.

R
 Abdul Rahman – Afghan convert to Catholic Christianity who escaped the death penalty because of foreign pressure
 Dewi Rezer – Indonesian model of French descent

S

 Nazli Sabri (1894–1978), Queen of Egypt, converted to the Catholic Church in 1950 and took the name "Mary Elizabeth"
 Begum Samru – Kashmir ruler of Sardhana, a small principality near Meerut.
 Lamin Sanneh – scholar of missions and religious studies
 Bashir Shihab II (1767–1850), Lebanese Emir of Mount Lebanon who ruled Lebanon in the first half of the 19th century; his family was Sunni Muslim; he and some members of his family converted to the Maronite Catholic Church at the end of the 18th century
The Shihab family – prominent Lebanese noble family who originally belonged to Sunni Islam, and converted to Christianity at the end of the 18th century
 Skanderbeg (1405–1468), Albanian nobleman and military commander, was forcibly converted to Islam from Christianity, but reverted to Christianity later in life
Rudolf Carl von Slatin – Anglo-Austrian soldier and administrator in the Sudan
Albertus Soegijapranata – born in Surakarta, Dutch East Indies, to a Muslim courtier and his wife who later converted to Catholicism; the first native Indonesian bishop; known for his pro-nationalistic stance, often expressed as "100% Catholic, 100% Indonesian"
 Isabel de Solís – slave concubine and later the consort of Abu l-Hasan Ali, Sultan of Granada. After sultan's death, she converted to Roman Catholicism
Maria Aurora von Spiegel (born Fatima) – Turkish mistress of Augustus II and the wife of a Polish noble

T
 Tabaraji of Ternate – Indonesian sultan; converted to Roman Catholicism after 1534 and baptised with the name Dom Manuel

U
 Ismael Urbain – French journalist and interpreter.

V
 Francis Verney – English adventurer, soldier of fortune, and pirate. Converted to Catholicism shortly before his death

X
 Muley Xeque (Arabic: مولاي الشيخ Mawlay al-Shaykh (1566–1621), Moroccan prince, born in Marrakech in 1566; exiled in Spain, he converted to Roman Catholicism in Madrid and was known as Philip of Africa or Philip of Austria

Z
 Zaida of Seville – born an Iberian Muslim; when Seville fell to the Almoravids, she fled to the protection of Alfonso VI of Castile, becoming his mistress, converting to Christianity and taking the baptismal name of Isabel
 Zayd Abu Zayd (c. 1195–1265/1270), last Almohad governor of Valencia, Spain; remained a loyal ally of James I of Aragon; in 1236 he converted to Roman Catholicism, adopting the name of Vicente Bellvis, a fact which he kept secret until the fall of Valencia
 Saye Zerbo – President of the Republic of Upper Volta (now Burkina Faso)

See also
 :Category:Converts to Roman Catholicism from Islam
 List of converts to the Catholic Church
 List of converts to Christianity from Islam
 Catholic Church and Islam
 Catholic Church in the Middle East

Main articles
 Religious conversion
Deathbed conversion
 Secondary conversion

Catholicism-related lists
 List of Roman Catholic Church artists
 List of Catholic authors
 List of Catholic philosophers and theologians

References

External links
 Historic Catholic Converts to Catholicism Produced by EWTN hosted by Fr. Charles Connor – Real Audio

Catholicism
Converts
 
Converts